The 1st constituency of the Nièvre is a French legislative constituency in the Nièvre département.

Description

The 1st constituency of the Nièvre covers the western portion of the department and includes the prefecture Nevers.

The seat was substantially changed prior to the 2012 election as a result of the 2010 redistricting of French legislative constituencies in which Nièvre lost one of its three historic constituencies. The new seat, like its predecessor, continued to elect Socialist representation until 2017.

The seat was represented by former Prime Minister Pierre Bérégovoy until his suicide shortly after the 1993 election, an election in which the Socialist Party under his leadership suffered a huge defeat.

Historic Representation

Election results

2022 

 
 
|-
| colspan="8" bgcolor="#E9E9E9"|
|-

2017

2012

 
 
 
 
 
 
|-
| colspan="8" bgcolor="#E9E9E9"|
|-

Sources
Official results of French elections from 2002: "Résultats électoraux officiels en France" (in French).

1